The habanero is a variety of chili pepper.

Habanero may also refer to:

A person or thing from Havana, capital of Cuba
Sexteto Habanero (later Septeto Habanero), a Cuban son ensemble
El Habanero (newspaper), a Cuban newspaper
Bōkun Habanero, a Japanese snack food company
Habanero-tan, the Bōkun Habanero mascot

See also
Habanera (disambiguation)
Habano (disambiguation)